Faouj Maghawir al-Bahr or the Syrian Marines is a military unit based in the Latakia Governorate. It has participated in operations in the Syrian Civil War.

In February 2016, the Syrian Marines participated in a Latakia offensive alongside Syrian government forces.

In March 2016, a large number of Syrian Marine convoys were deployed to the Battle of Palmyra from northern Latakia.

On 25 November 2016, several units of the SSNP and Syrian marines arrived to Aleppo city in participation of Operation Dawn of Victory. Most of them were redeployed from the Latakia governorate.

On 23 February 2017, al-Masdar News reported that over 900 Syrian Marines had joined the Military Security Shield Forces in order to avoid being drafted into the regular army.

See also
Suqour al-Sahara
Syrian Navy
Tiger Forces

References

Pro-government factions of the Syrian civil war
Military units and formations of Syria
Military units and formations established in 2016
Marines